The Salado Formation is a geologic formation in west Texas and southeastern New Mexico. It was deposited in the Ochoan Stage of the Permian period.

Description
The formation is found within the Delaware Basin and was deposited after the Capitan Formation, the fossil reef defining the margins of the Delaware Basin. The Salado Formation lies on the Castile Formation and in turn is overlain by the Rustler Formation, and is found almost entirely in the subsurface, with only limited and very poor surface exposures. In locations towards the margins of the Delaware Basin, the Salado Formation is composed mostly of anhydrite and gypsum resembling the Castile, and here the contact is placed at a bed of breccia thought to represent an unconformity between the two formations.

The Salado Formation, and the underlying Castile Formation, form an evaporite sequence that formed in a very deep basin (over ) from increasingly saline waters.

History of investigation
The beds belonging to this formation were initially included in the Castile Formation of George Burr Richardson. In 1935, Walter B. Lang removed the upper beds of the Castile, which include extensive halite beds in the subsurface, into the Salado Formation.

Footnotes

References
 
 
 
 
 

Permian formations of New Mexico
Permian formations of Texas